Me and My Cat? is a 1999 children's picture book by Satoshi Kitamura. It is about a boy, Nicholas, who switches bodies with his cat, Leonardo.

Plot 

In this story, before Nicholas and his pet cat swap roles so Nicholas does not have to go to school a witch appears. She comes into Nicholas's bedroom. Then she brandishes her broom, says magic words, and leaves without even saying goodbye. The next morning, Nicholas's mom comes in. She angrily calls out, "NICHOLAS!? WAKE UP! YOU ARE GOING TO BE LATE FOR SCHOOL!" (telling him that if he is not up yet, he would be late for school). Then she drags Nicholas into the bathroom and makes him wash and dress. Downstairs, she interrupted Nicholas's breakfast. Nicholas was gone for school, but he remained at home. Suddenly, Nicholas found out that he was a cat. Nicholas became Leonardo, and Leonardo became Nicholas.

When Nicholas's mom saw that something was wrong with her son, she called the doctor (Dr. Wire). She asked Dr. Wire to "come at once". Then Dr. Wire checked on Nicholas (while Nicholas was sitting on his mother's lap). He said, "Never mind about that. He is just a little overtired. Send him to bed early and he is fine in the morning". Nicholas's mom was still very worried and upset. She hugged Nicholas (in Leonardo's body) tightly in her arms and stroked him. Nicholas (in Leonardo's body), he purred. Then Leonardo (in Nicholas's body) joined in. And the mother stroked him too. Leonardo (in Nicholas's body), he purred too. 

At the end point, the witch enters Nicholas's room again. And she tells him, "I am sorry love. I had the wrong address". When the witch realizes that she "got the wrong address", she undoes her work. She brandishes her broom at Nicholas and Leonardo (while Nicholas is asleep) and says magic words. Then she leaves without even saying goodnight. In the morning, Nicholas's mom wakes up Nicholas. Nicholas's mom angrily calls out, "NICHOLAS!? WAKE UP! YOU ARE GOING TO BE LATE FOR SCHOOL!" (telling him that if he is not up yet, he would be late for school). Despite the fact that his mom dragged him into the bathroom, everything was back to normal. Then at Nicholas's school, it is revealed that his teacher has a cat like Nicholas. Since the teacher Mr. McGough has a cat, he ends up switching bodies and voices with his own cat. Mr. McGough (who swapped roles with his own cat) sat down on his table. He scratched himself, licked his shirt, and fell asleep for the rest of the school day (possibly for the entire school year).

Reception
In a review, the New York Times wrote "Kitamura's art resembles the animation seen on the Cartoon Network, edgy and angular, a style that becomes a barrier to the artist's intent when the plan is to depict the smooth, springy suppleness of cats. And that -- evoking memories of familiar feline postures for the sake of a laugh -- is what this book is all about. Still, many children will no doubt respond with laugh-track chuckles, especially to the sight of a boy squatting in a litter box. My test audience -- that is, my inner 6-year-old -- obviously did not." while Kirkus Reviews calls it "Silly good fun." and Publishers Weekly wrote "this latest by Kitamura spotlights an offbeat sense of humor and a flair for comic-book layout."

It has also been reviewed by Booklist, the School Library Journal, and The Horn Book Magazine.

Awards and nominations
 Kurt Maschler Award - nominated
 2000 Silver Smarties Book Award - won

Adaptations
Me and My Cat? has been adapted for the stage.

References

External links
Library holdings of :Me and My Cat?

1999 children's books
British children's books
British picture books
Books about cats
Fiction about body swapping
Japanese picture books